Blow Up the Moon is the twelfth studio album by American rock band Blues Traveler, released on April 7, 2015. Every track on the album was recorded as a collaboration; guests on the album include 3OH!3, JC Chasez, The Dirty Heads, Rome Ramirez, Hanson, Plain White T's, Thompson Square, Secondhand Serenade, New Hollow, Jewel, Bowling for Soup, and Thomas Ian Nicholas.

Critical reception

Stephen Thomas Erlewine of AllMusic described the album as "pleasingly bizarre, a pandering time capsule bound to satisfy no one", stating that "in some ways, a record this monumentally odd is better than a good record."

Track listing
 "Hurricane"  – 3:44
 "Blow Up the Moon"  – 4:30
 "Castaway"  – 3:10
 "Vagabond Blues"  – 3:05
 "Top of the World"  – 4:21
 "Nikkia's Prom"  – 3:32
 "Matador"  – 4:01
 "I Can Still Feel You"  – 4:12
 "The Darkness We All Need"  – 3:54
 "Jackie's Baby"  – 4:18
 "Hearts Are Still Awake"  – 3:44
 "I Know Right"  – 3:30
 "Right Here Waiting for You"  – 3:15
 "All the Way"  – 3:37

References

2015 albums
Blues Traveler albums